The Saint-Athanase River is a tributary of the south shore of the Saguenay River flowing into the municipality of Petit-Saguenay in the Le Fjord-du-Saguenay Regional County Municipality, Quebec, Canada.

The Saint-Athanase River Valley is mainly served by Saint-Louis Road and Saint-Etienne Road.

Forestry is the first economic activity in the sector; recreational tourism activities, second.

The surface of the Saint-Athanase River is usually frozen from the beginning of December to the end of March, however, safe ice circulation is generally from mid-December to mid-March.

Geography 
The main hydrographic slopes near the Saint-Athanase River are:
 North side: Saguenay River;
 East side: Saint-Étienne River, Petites Îles River, St. Lawrence River;
 South side: Petit Saguenay River;
 West side: Petit Saguenay River, Cabanage River.

The Saint-Athanase River rises at the mouth of Petit Lac Alphée. This source is located at:
  south of its mouth (confluence with the Saguenay River);
  northeast of the Petit Saguenay River;
  west of the mouth of the Saguenay River;
  east of the village center of Petit-Saguenay.

From its source (Petit Lac Alphée), the course of the Saint-Athanase River descends on  according to the following segments:
  easterly, forming a curve to the north, to the discharge (coming from the north) of a group of small lakes;
  easterly forming at the beginning of a segment a hook to the south, to the discharge (coming from the south) of a set of small lakes;
  northerly forming a large S, to the discharge (from the east) of an unidentified lake;
  northerly, curving to the northeast, to the discharge (from the east) of a set of unidentified lakes;
  northwesterly to a dump of unidentified lakes;
  north in a steep valley curving westward around a large mountain to its mouth.

The mouth of the Saint-Athanase River flows into the bottom of "Anse au Cheval" on the south shore of the Saguenay River. This confluence is located at:

  northwest of the village center of Saint-Étienne;
  northeast of the confluence of the Petit Saguenay River with the Saguenay River;
  west of Tadoussac.

Toponymy
The toponym "rivière Saint-Athanase" (St. Athanase River) refers to St. Athanasius, a patron of the Roman Catholic Church.

The toponym "Saint-Athanase River" was formalized on December 5, 1968, at the Bank of place names of the Commission de toponymie du Quebec.

Notes and references

External links

See also 
 Petit-Saguenay, a municipality
 Saguenay River, a watercourse
 List of rivers of Quebec

Rivers of Saguenay–Lac-Saint-Jean
Le Fjord-du-Saguenay Regional County Municipality